The 1942 Copa del Generalísimo was the 40th staging of the Copa del Rey, the Spanish football cup competition.

The competition began on 26 April 1942 and ended on 21 June 1942 with the final, where CF Barcelona won their ninth title.

First round

|}
Tiebreaker

|}

Round of 16

|}
Tiebreaker

|}

Quarter-finals

|}
Tiebreaker

|}

Semi-finals

|}

Final

|}

External links
 rsssf.com
 linguasport.com

Copa del Rey seasons
Copa del Rey
Copa